Palomar (subtitled The Heartbreak Soup Stories) is the title of a graphic novel written and drawn by Gilbert Hernandez and published in 2003 by Fantagraphics Books. It collects work previously published within the pages of Love and Rockets (volume one). Palomar is the fictional town in Latin America where all the stories presented are set. Palomar is included in Time magazine's Best Comics of 2003 list, and in 2005 was one of Time's 100 best graphic novels of all time.

2003 graphic novels
Comics publications
Fictional populated places
Fantagraphics titles